Dumb and Dumber is a 1994 film.

Dumb and Dumber may also refer to:

Dumb and Dumber (franchise), based on the film
Dumb and Dumber (TV series)
"Dumb & Dumber" (song), by iKon, 2016

See also
Dum and Dummer, a 2019 album by Young Dolph and Key Glock